= The Gate of Truth =

The Gate of Truth can refer to:

- Gate of Alchemy from the anime Fullmetal Alchemist
- The Gate of Truth in Hades, from Virgil's Aeneid
